Josefrazowskia is a genus of moths of the family Tortricidae. It contains only one species, Josefrazowskia recondita, which is found in South Africa.

Etymology
The genus name refers to Worcester, the type locality of the type-species. The species name refers to the separate systematic position of the species within the Archipini tribe and is derived from Latin recorndita (meaning well distanced).

See also
List of Tortricidae genera

References

	
Moths described in 2006
Archipini